Scotchtown may refer to:
Scotchtown, Indiana
Scotchtown, New York
Scotchtown, Nova Scotia
Scotchtown, Tasmania, a locality in Australia
Scotchtown (plantation), a historic Virginia home once owned by Patrick Henry
Scotchtown, County Cavan, a townland in Cavan, Ireland
Scotchtown, County Tyrone, a townland in County Tyrone, Northern Ireland